Garrou-Morganton Full-Fashioned Hosiery Mills, also known as Premier Hosiery Mills and Morgantown Hosiery Mills, is a historic hosiery mill complex located at Morganton, Burke County, North Carolina.  The complex encompasses three contributing buildings and one contributing structure. They are the two Art Moderne style main buildings (1927-1929 and 1928–1939); Outlet Store (1924) and Water Tower Structure (c. 1939).

It was listed on the National Register of Historic Places in 1999.

References

Industrial buildings and structures on the National Register of Historic Places in North Carolina
Industrial buildings completed in 1928
Streamline Moderne architecture in the United States
Buildings and structures in Burke County, North Carolina
National Register of Historic Places in Burke County, North Carolina
1928 establishments in North Carolina